John Laurent Giles (1901–1969) was an English naval architect who was particularly famous for his sailing yachts. He and his company, Laurent Giles & Partners Ltd, designed more than 1000 boats from cruisers and racing yachts to megayachts.

Examples
Notable examples of Laurent Giles' work include the famous  Vertue (sail numbers suggest that some 230 of these have been made), Wanderer III, the 30' sloop in which Eric and Susan Hiscock circumnavigated, and the race-winning Gulvain, the first ocean racing yacht to be made from an aluminium alloy.

His famous Myth of Malham, a revolutionary small displacement yacht for John Illingworth, was inspired by developments in aeronautics; the novel design helped win the Fastnet race in 1947 and 1949. The updated Miranda IV of 1951 had a rudder mounted separately from the aft of the keel (a 'spade rudder') which heralded the arrival of the modern period of yacht design.

Laurent Giles described as part of his design philosophy that a yacht should have "the utmost docility and sureness of manoeuvring at sea, in good or bad weather" - his boats were designed to maintain a steady course with minimal action by the helmsman but respond instantly to the helm if the need arose.

He was awarded the honour of Royal Designer for Industry in 1951.

Select List of Designs by Laurent Giles
 First Yacht Lutine (C&N 60')
 Gulvain
 Jolly Boat (Laurent Giles)
 Vive Sailboat 33', 1950 (Woodnutts-Laurent Giles)
 Lymington-L-Class (1933) and the later modified/ revised L-Class design of 1955
 Maid of Malin 
 Peter Duck (yacht)
 R.N.S.A. 24 (32'), 1947
 Robert C. Seamans (ship)
 Sails Of Dawn, Mc Gruer 57', 1969, the final yacht before Giles' death
 Seamaster Sailer 19
 Seamaster Sailer 23
 Vertue (yacht)
 Vertue II- a beamier version of the original Vertue design, mostly made in GRP
 Wanderer Class, 29’9”, 9 tons
 Westerly Yachts (Westerly Marine Construction Ltd) - a number of designs, including their Centaur 26, Pageant 24, Chieftain 26, GK24, Longbow 31, Westerly 33, Discus 33 and Konsort 29.

See also
 :Category:Sailing yachts designed by Laurent Giles
 :Category:Boats designed by Laurent Giles

External links 
 Laurent Giles Naval Architects
 Sailboat designs of Jack Laurent Giles at Sailboatdata.com
 The Laurent Giles Archive includes a full register of yachts; original construction and outfit drawings for many of projects produced by Laurent Giles & partners Ltd (1927 - 1979), Laurent Giles Ltd (1979 - 1987)and Laurent Giles Naval Architects Ltd (1987–present) are available.
 Brief biography of Laurent Giles in Spanish
Plans of Laurent Giles including GK 24.

References

1901 births
1969 deaths
British yacht designers